Classic FM  may refer to a number classical music radio stations, including:

 ABC Classic FM, former name of ABC Classic, in Australia  
 Classic FM (UK)
 Classic FM TV, a defunct British TV channel owned by Classic FM 
 Classic FM (Bulgaria)
 Classic FM (Czech Republic), renamed into Classic Praha
 Classic FM (Netherlands), renamed Classicnl
 Classic FM, former name of Hot 1027, in South Africa 
 Classic FM (United States), in Syracuse, Utica and Watertown, New York
 KBS Classic FM (KBS 1FM), run by the Korean Broadcasting System in South Korea